Andre Ettienne (born 9 October 1990) is a Trinidadian professional footballer who currently plays as a defender for Trinidad and Tobago national football team. He last played for Gokulam Kerala in the I-League.

Career statistics

Honours
Gokulam Kerala
Durand Cup: 2019

References

1990 births
Living people
Trinidad and Tobago footballers
Trinidad and Tobago international footballers
Central F.C. players
Point Fortin Civic F.C. players
C.D. Honduras Progreso players
Association football defenders